Alberico Giaquinta or Alberico Jacquinti or Alberico Giaquinto (died 1548) was a Roman Catholic prelate who served as Bishop of Telese o Cerreto Sannita (1540–1548).

Biography
On 30 April 1540, Alberico Giaquinta was appointed during the papacy of Pope Paul III as Bishop of Telese o Cerreto Sannita.
He served as Bishop of Telese o Cerreto Sannita until his death in 1548.

References

External links and additional sources
 (Chronology of Bishops) 
 (Chronology of Bishops) 

16th-century Italian Roman Catholic bishops
Bishops appointed by Pope Paul III
1548 deaths